WKMG-TV (channel 6) is a television station in Orlando, Florida, United States, affiliated with CBS and owned by Graham Media Group. The station's studios are located on John Young Parkway (SR 423) in Orlando, and its transmitter is located in unincorporated Bithlo, Florida.

History
The station first signed on the air on July 1, 1954, under the callsign WDBO-TV (short for "Way Down By Orlando"). It is the sixth-oldest television station in Florida, and the oldest in Central Florida. It was originally owned by the Orlando Broadcasting Company, which also owned WDBO radio (580 AM and 92.3 FM, now WWKA). Its original studios were located on Texas Avenue, just north of Colonial Drive. As the only station in the market at its inception, it originally carried programming from all four networks of the time—CBS, NBC, ABC and DuMont. DuMont would shut down most network operations in 1955, but honor network commitments until 1956; at that point, DuMont programming disappeared from the schedule. It lost NBC when Daytona Beach's WESH expanded its signal to cover all of Central Florida in November 1957, and ABC when WLOF-TV (now WFTV) signed on in February 1958.

Orlando Broadcasting merged with Cherry Broadcasting in 1957. In 1963, WDBO-AM-FM-TV were sold to The Outlet Company, marking that company's first major broadcasting acquisition outside of its homebase in Providence, Rhode Island. In 1982, the WDBO radio stations were sold to Katz Broadcasting, as Outlet decided to begin exiting radio. Outlet was nearly bought out by Columbia Pictures around the same time. In advance of this, channel 6 prematurely changed its call letters to WCPX-TV on June 6 (which stood for "Columbia Pix", shorthand for "Pictures"). While the deal fell through, channel 6 kept the WCPX calls for 16 years. WCPX moved into its current studios on John Young Parkway in 1984. Outlet pared down its holdings after a buyout in 1986, selling off many of its television stations. At that point, WCPX was sold to First Media Television L.P., a private company controlled by the Marriott Corporation.

In 1997, First Media merged with the Meredith Corporation, which already owned Fox affiliate WOFL (channel 35). At the time, duopolies were not allowed, and Meredith decided to keep WOFL (which was sold to Fox Television Stations in 2002), along with First Media's two other stations WHNS in Asheville, North Carolina and KPDX in Portland, Oregon.  In June 1997, Meredith swapped WCPX to what was then known as Post-Newsweek Stations in exchange for Hartford, Connecticut's WFSB (which at the time was Post-Newsweek's flagship station).  The trade reunited WCPX with KSAT-TV in San Antonio, which Outlet, in 1986, sold to H&C Communications (former owner of WESH and of another Post-Newsweek sister station, KPRC-TV in Houston) and then sold by H&C to Post-Newsweek in 1994. On January 30, 1998, the station changed its callsign to WKMG in honor of longtime Washington Post publisher, Katharine M. Graham, with the WCPX call letters going to Chicago's Pax TV (now Ion Television) station in August of that same year. As of recently, WKMG is the last "Big Six" affiliate in Orlando that is not part of any television duopoly (Fox's WOFL and WRBW, Cox Media Group's WFTV and WRDQ, and Hearst Television's WESH and WKCF). Post-Newsweek Stations became Graham Media Group on July 28, 2014.

Programming
As a CBS affiliate, WKMG-TV clears the network's entire lineup of programs. Syndicated programs currently airing on WKMG-TV include Inside Edition and Rachael Ray. Its late-evening Saturday schedule includes two original programs from the station's news department: After the Whistle and Getting Answers.

In the early 1990s, WCPX decided to move the CBS program Picket Fences from Friday evenings to 11:35 p.m. on Saturdays, instead airing the syndicated Star Trek: The Next Generation in prime time on Fridays, a rarity for a big three network affiliate. WCPX also preempted some CBS Sports programs as well. In 1994, WCPX hired a new general manager, Brooke Spectorsky, from WUAB in Cleveland (Spectorsky is now general manager of that city's NBC affiliate WKYC). Under Spectorsky and after the ending of Star Trek: The Next Generation, WCPX put Picket Fences back at its normal time and the station added stereo sound capability as well in July 1995.

In 1995, WCPX was one of the first CBS affiliates to air Guiding Light at 10 a.m. instead of 3 p.m., which was the network's recommended timeslot for the program. Under this arrangement, the program would air on a delay with episodes running one day behind (three days with the Friday editions). However, CBS soon discovered that several of its owned-and-operated stations were using the same scheduling for the program as WCPX. CBS then decided to provide two (eventually three) same-day feeds of Guiding Light to its stations (one each at 9 a.m., 10 a.m., and 3 p.m.). WKMG aired Guiding Light at 9 a.m., until the soap opera ended its run on September 18, 2009;  the practice continued for its successor program, Let's Make a Deal, through the end of the 2015–16 season. In the fall of 2016, Let's Make a Deal was moved back to 3 p.m. as a lead-in to WKMG's 4 p.m. newscast.

News operation
WKMG-TV presently broadcasts 44 hours of locally produced newscasts each week (with 7½ hours each weekday, three hours on Saturdays and 3½ hours on Sundays). From the late 1980s until 2001, the station was almost always in last place in the ratings. At the same time, WESH and WFTV battled for first place in the Orlando market, and basically continued to do so into the early 2000s; however, in the past few years, WFTV has become the dominant station (though channel 6 claimed first place at 11 p.m. in the May 2006 ratings period). Management changes at WKMG had a number of general managers on the treadmill with Mike Schweitzer, Kathleen Keefe, Jeff Sales and Henry Maldonado all taking a turn at the top. News and sales departments had similar turnover, with at least five news directors taking the chair between 2000 and 2008.

Currently, despite the strength of CBS prime time programming, WKMG has been trading second and third place with WESH in the evening newscast ratings except at 11 p.m., where until recently it waged a spirited battle with WFTV for first. From late 2007 to March 2009, WKMG's 11 p.m. newscast was in second place behind WFTV. Continuing its ratings slide, the May 2009 sweeps found WKMG's newscasts finishing in third place in all timeslots, behind WFTV and WESH. In fact, despite being number one in prime time WKMG's late night newscast has failed to hold on to its lead-in audience for the most part. The siphoning off in news audience share appears to have held in the November 2009 sweeps period, when WKMG remained in a distant third place weekday evenings while its morning and late night newscasts improved slightly although still in a distant second place.

In 2008, WKMG-TV began broadcasting its local newscasts in widescreen standard definition. On May 1, 2009, the station's 4, 5 and 5:30 p.m. newscasts were dropped, with the 5-6 p.m. news block replaced by Dr. Phil, which had aired in the 5 p.m. slot to compete against newscasts on WFTV, WESH and WOFL, and a new hour-long newscast at 6:00 debuted. It was the market's first and only full hour of news at 6 p.m. and pushed the CBS Evening News to 7 p.m. However, on January 3, 2011, the Evening News returned to the 6:30 half-hour, and a new half-hour 7 p.m. newscast took its place. In September 2011, WKMG relaunched a half-hour 5 p.m. newscast, with syndicated entertainment newsmagazine The Insider following it at 5:30 p.m., replacing Dr. Phil which ended up moving to WOFL.

For the February 2012 sweeps period, WKMG took first place in the 25-to-54 demographic at 11 p.m., beating WESH by 5,000 viewers and WFTV by 5,700 viewers. On June 2, 2012, WKMG became the last major television station in the Orlando market, as well as the last Post-Newsweek owned station, to upgrade its newscasts to full high definition.

On August 28, 2015, WKMG dropped the "Local" branding from their name and began calling themselves News 6. On September 7, 2015, WKMG relaunched their 4 p.m. newscast with Julie Broughton as anchor.

On April 6, 2020, WKMG began its expanded weekday morning newscast with an extra half-hour starting at 4:30 a.m., thus becoming the last of the four major television stations in the market to start in that same time slot.

Notable former on-air staff
Lisa Colagrossi (later worked at WABC-TV in New York City; deceased)
Mark McEwen (formerly of CBS News, later with Black News Channel)
Trace Gallagher (has been at Fox News Channel since its inception in 1996)
Jerry Hodak (retired from WXYZ-TV in Detroit)
Shepard Smith (worked at Fox News Channel from 1996 to 2019, was most recently at CNBC)
Tom Terry (now chief meteorologist at WFTV)

Technical information

Subchannels
The station's digital signal is multiplexed:

WKMG's 6.2 subchannel was originally affiliated with LATV, and (along with three other Post-Newsweek stations) was among the network's launch affiliates on April 23, 2007. In addition to LATV, during the Casey Anthony trial, the subchannel was used to carry CBS Daytime and syndicated programming from 9 a.m. to 5 p.m., to accommodate trial coverage on WKMG's primary channel at the time; it had earlier planned to air trial coverage in full on 6.2 to minimize disruption to WKMG's main schedule. The LATV affiliation ended on April 2, 2012; at that time, the 6.2 subchannel became an affiliate of the Retro Television Network. RTV was previously seen in Orlando on a subchannel of WRDQ. Live Well Network began airing on 6.3 on April 1, 2013. The 6.2 subchannel again carried WKMG's daytime schedule during the station's coverage of the George Zimmerman trial.

On January 26, 2014, Retro TV's sister network Heartland was added to 6.3 and Live Well Network moved to 6.2, with Retro TV entirely discontinued.

On November 11, 2014, WKMG dropped Live Well in favor of Cozi TV.  In December 2018, WKMG activated 6.4 to serve as Orlando's affiliate of Start TV.  Later, WKMG added Dabl to 6.2, replacing Cozi TV, which moved to 6.3.  Decades, which was on 6.3, moved to 6.5 at the same time.

Analog-to-digital conversion
WKMG-TV shut down its analog signal, on VHF channel 6, on June 12, 2009, as part of the federally mandated transition from analog to digital television. The station's digital signal remained on its pre-transition UHF channel 26. Through the use of PSIP, digital television receivers continues to display the station's virtual channel as its former VHF analog channel 6.1. WKMG's audio signal was formerly available at 87.75 MHz on the FM band in Orlando, Daytona Beach and surrounding areas, though at a slightly lower volume than FM radio stations due to TV modulation standards. The transition to digital broadcasting also ended reception of the station's audio signal at 87.75 MHz.

WKMG was one of three stations in the Orlando area (along with WKCF and WOFL) to participate in the "Analog Nightlight" program, until WKMG's analog transmitter was shut down permanently on July 12, 2009.

Translator
WKMG-TV operates a translator station serving Ocala and northern parts of the broadcast market. Originally W29AB (channel 29), it  operated as a translator for WTOG in St. Petersburg until 1995. The station became W42DJ-D (channel 42) in 2010. On November 5, 2019, the translator changed its call sign for a third time to W21DX-D and started broadcasting on channel 21; it became WKMG-LD on July 23, 2020.

References

External links

WKMG History

CBS network affiliates
Dabl affiliates
Cozi TV affiliates
Start TV affiliates
Decades (TV network) affiliates
KMG-TV
Television channels and stations established in 1954
Graham Media Group
1954 establishments in Florida